V. S. Raghavan was an Indian film director, producer and audiographer  in the 1950s and 1960s in the South Indian film industry. He produced his films under the banner of  Revathi Productions and owned a recording studio.

Career
Raghavan directed films including Kalvanin Kadhali (1955), Sarangadhara (1958), Manimegalai (1959), Chandrika (1950 - Malayalam).

V. S. Raghavan was working as the sound engineer in AVM studios and is the pioneer sound engineer in South India. He was trained by C. E. Biggs of Gemini Studios. Satya Harischandra, a Kannada film was dubbed into Tamil. It is the first dubbed film in Tamil cinema. V. S. Raghavan was the audiographer

Filmography
Kalvanin Kadhali (1955)
Sarangadhara (1958)
Manimegalai (1959)
Chandrika (1950) (Malayalam)

Personal life
His full name was V. Srinivasa Raghavan, often simply credited as V. S. Raghavan.  (not be confused with actor V. S. Raghavan). His first wife was Jayalakshmi. His second wife lux R. Padma was actress from Tamil film industry.

References

Tamil-language film directors
Year of birth missing
Year of death missing
Malayalam film directors
20th-century Indian film directors